Michael James Toal (born March 23, 1959) is a Canadian former professional ice hockey centre.  Selected in the fifth round (105th overall) in the 1979 NHL Entry Draft by the Edmonton Oilers, he played three games for the Oilers in the 1979–80 season. As a junior player, he was named to the WHL Second All-Star Team in 1979 after a productive season with the Portland Winter Hawks. After spending most of three seasons in the minor leagues, Toal retired in 1982.

Career statistics

Regular season and playoffs

Awards
 WHL Second All-Star Team – 1979

External links 

1959 births
Living people
Billings Bighorns players
Calgary Centennials players
Canadian ice hockey centres
Edmonton Oilers draft picks
Edmonton Oilers players
Houston Apollos players
Ice hockey people from Alberta
Portland Winterhawks players
Sportspeople from Red Deer, Alberta
Victoria Cougars (WHL) players
Wichita Wind players